Alexander Hamilton High School (also known as Milwaukee Hamilton) is a public high school located at 6215 West Warnimont Avenue in Milwaukee, Wisconsin, on Milwaukee's far southwest side. Named after the first Secretary of the Treasury, Alexander Hamilton, the building was opened in February 1966, with about 450 second-semester sophomores from Pulaski High School. During the 2012–2013 school year enrollment was about 1700.

Academics
Hamilton has five programs leading to career, college, or armed forces readiness: Business and Finance, Communications Technology, Medical and Laboratory Sciences, JROTC, and Honors/Advanced Placement. Hamilton also has its own student-run branch of Educators Credit Union.

A minimum of 22 credits are required to graduate. Students can graduate with as many as 29 credits.

Extra-curricular activities

Hamilton's clubs include:
Army JROTC
Asian Club
Band
Debate/Forensics 
DECA
Drama
Gay-Straight Alliance
Humanities
Latino Unidos (Spanish club)
Letterwinners
National Honor Society
Prom committee
Renaissance (for students with good academics)
School yearbook
Senior board
Stage crew
Student Council

Athletics
In athletics Hamilton competes at the Wisconsin Interscholastic Athletic Association Division I level as a member of the Milwaukee City Conference. Athletics at Hamilton include:
Baseball
Boys' basketball
Girls' basketball
Boys' cross country
Girls' cross country
Football
Boys' golf
Boys' soccer
Girls' soccer
Softball
Boys' swimming
Girls' swimming
Boys' tennis
Girls' tennis
Boys' track
Girls' track
Girls' volleyball
Wrestling

Notable alumni 
 Joe Dudzik, Alderman
 Kevon Looney, basketball player for 2017 and 2018 NBA champion Golden State Warriors
 Jessie Rodriguez, Wisconsin state representative
 Kevin Soucie, politician
 Gary Zauner, football coach

References

External links 
 Alexander Hamilton High School website

High schools in Milwaukee
Educational institutions established in 1966
Public high schools in Wisconsin
1966 establishments in Wisconsin